Compton Russell is a Jamaican former professional tennis player.

Russell, a Wimbledon junior quarter-finalist, played collegiate tennis for the UCLA Bruins. He was a Davis Cup representative for the combined Caribbean team, appearing in 1971, 1972 and 1981.

From a tennis family, Russell is a cousin of tennis player Richard Russell. His brother Greg was an assistant coach at Harvard and another brother Norman played collegiate tennis for Eastern Kentucky University.

References

External links
 
 
 

Year of birth missing (living people)
Living people
Jamaican male tennis players
UCLA Bruins men's tennis players